= Bríd Nic Phádhraic =

Bríd Nic Phádhraic (in English, Bridgit FitzPatrick) is the name of a woman from County Mayo in Ireland who is immortalised in an 18th or 19th-century folk song. The song was probably written by her father, brother and a neighbour.

In translation from Gaelic, three verses of the song are as follows:

"If you ever go to Rahard/look on the stately lady of the branching hair/look at fair Biddy of the lime-white hands/and you need never fear death."

"The shine of the rowan-berry/is on her cheeks of brightest smoothness/the fin fragrance of thyme/is always on her kiss."

"She is laid out on planks/to be coffined tomorrow/and let that be the cause of gladness/for the fine women of the world."

Commenting upon it in a 1982 article, Brian O'Rourke says "One gets the impression that the writer, having demonstrated his inexaustible ability to mint stereotyped images, felt the need to provide proof, finally, of his freedom from the convention, by breaking the mould of the panegyric, and making this inconsequent sally into the domain of mock-lament".
